, in English Hitler Youth Quex, is a 1933 Nazi propaganda film directed by Hans Steinhoff, based on the similarly named 1932 novel Der Hitlerjunge Quex by Karl Aloys Schenzinger. The film was shown in the US under the title Our Flag Leads Us Forward.

Plot summary 
Heini Völker is a teenage boy, living in poverty with his mother and father. Heini's father, a veteran of the Great War, is an out-of-work supporter of the Communist Party. The organizer for the local communist chapter, a man named Stoppel, befriends Heini and invites him to an outing in the country, promising him swimming, camping and games. Heini accepts and duly turns up at the railway station the next day. The Hitler Youth are also there, taking the same train.

When the communists arrive at their own camp, there is only smoking, drinking, and dancing.  Boys and girls play games like cards, unlike the games which Heini expected.  Heini doesn't feel welcome, and wanders away.  In another part of the forest, Heini comes across the Hitler Youth camping by a lake where they are holding a midsummer bonfire. Heini watches them from a distance, but is caught by them, and taken into the camp, but they recognised him as having travelled with the communists, and so they send him away as well.  Heini sees them doing all the things that he hoped to participate in, i.e. 'wholesome' camping and swimming.  He is enamored by their singing.  In the morning, Heini watches the Hitler Youth's morning activities, but Stoppel comes looking for him.  He hides from Stoppel and instead catches a ride into town from a stranger.  When Heini returns to his home, he tells his mother about the Hitler Youth, and sings one of their songs to her, but his father overhears it and beats him for it.

Heini wants to join the Hitler Youth and visits one of the Hitler Youth members' home, promising to come to the opening of their new club house.  However, he arrives late, just as the communists are attacking the Hitler Youth members.  Even though he had nothing to do with the attack, he is among those arrested by the police.  The police arrest some of the Hitler Youth, but no communists.  When the police let him go, he is recognised by the Hitler Youth members, who accuse him of colluding with the communists during the attack.

Stoppel is impressed by the fact that Heini didn't tell the police that the communists were the ones who started the ruckus.  He confides in him that the communists plan to attack the Hitler Youth later that day, but Heini is distraught and threatens to tell the Hitler Youth about the attack.  He attempts to warn Ulla by telephone, but Fritz dismisses the matter.  Heini also informs the police, but they do not believe him either.  In the end, Ulla seems to have convinced Fritz to do something, as the communists' weapons store is blown up.

Stoppel realises that Heini must have warned the Hitler Youth, and he goes to Heini's house and hints to his mother that he is going to kill him.  However, later Stoppel has a change of heart and orders the communists not to retaliate against Heini. Heini's mother is so distraught that she decides to kill her son and herself by shutting the windows and leaving the gas on in their apartment at night. She is killed, but Heini survives.

Heini's father happens to meet Heini's Hitler Youth troop leader, Kass, when both men go to see Heini at the hospital. It is here that Heini's father reveals that he was injured in the war, and that that is the reason he could not work.  Kass attempts to convince Heini's father to join the Nazis.  Heini decides to move into a hostel run by the Hitler Youth, where he discovers to his dismay that not all members of Hitler Youth have such high moral values as he had thought.  They call him Quex, originally as an insult, a shortening of “Quecksilber” (quicksilver).

The Hitler Youth leader takes care not to send Heini to the district where the communists live, but they find out where he is staying. Stoppel seeks Heini out on the street, and tries to convince him to return to the communists. Heini refuses, and Stoppel warns him not to return to the communist district.  One day, one of the Hitler Youth is beaten up by the communists while putting up posters, and Heini convinces his leader to allow him to visit the communist district to hand out flyers.  However, his fellow Hitler Youth Grundler has been taken in by the communist girl Gerda, and throws all the flyers in the river.  Heini then offers to reprint all the posters during the night and puts up the posters before the morning.  The communists hear about this and chase him and stab him. The Hitler Youth find him lying face-down dying.

Themes 

A recurring character in the film is the Communist street performer.  His theme is that "for some people things work out well... but for George they never do."  The message is that life in Germany may improve for everyone else, but for the working man, George, life won't be good unless he joins the Communist Party.

Heini Völker's antagonist is the communist youth leader Wilde, "a Nazi version of the incarnation of the 'Jewish-Bolshevik' will to destruction".

The film allows some sympathy for communists.  Heini's father, though violent and drunk, has become a communist because of his, and the workers', desperate condition.  In one scene, his argument for his son being with him revolves around his sufferings in the war and his unemployment.  Stoppel, the communist who invited Heini to a Communist Youth outing, while saying that he has to be eliminated, takes no part in the killing, Quex having made a strong impression on him.

Differences from novel 

There are a number of significant differences between the novel and the film.

 The opening greengrocer scene in the film is absent in the novel.
 In the novel, Heini is an apprentice carpenter, whereas in the film, he is an apprentice printer.
 Heini's friends Kurt Bussack, Bruno Hellwig and Eugen Kappelmann do not appear in the film.
 The "elimination" wrestling-cum-boxing matches at the Bernau Forest do not occur in the film.
 Oskar Wisnewski is replaced with Grundler.
 Many scenes or activities are cut out of the film such as Kass's backstory, the visit to the Bannführer, the camp and the speech night.
 Kass in the novel was originally the Kameradschaftsführer of Heini's section, before becoming Scharführer. Heini then becomes the Kameradschaftsführer. In the film, Kass is the Bannführer whilst Fritz Dörries is Kameradschaftsführer.
 Heini in the novel is beaten up whilst walking home from the Dörries' house after a rehearsal for a play (which does not occur in the film), whereas in the film he is stabbed at the fairground after putting up posters. The hospital scene is not included in the film either, and Heini's final words, “Germany awake!” is replaced by “Our flag flies before us”.

Cast 
Jürgen Ohlsen as Heini Völker
Heinrich George as Vater Völker
Berta Drews as Mutter Völker
Claus Clausen as Bannführer Kaß (Brigade Leader Kass)
Franz Ramspott as Fritz Dörries (comradeship leader)
Helga Bodemer as Ulla Dörries
Rotraut Richter as Gerda
Hermann Speelmans as Stoppel
Hans Richter as Franz
Ernst Behmer as Kowalski
Hansjoachim Büttner as Arzt (doctor)
Franziska Kinz as Krankenschwester (nurse)
Hermann Braun as Grundler
Rudolf Platte as Moritatensänger (carnival singer)
Reinhold Bernt as Ausrufer (barker)
Hans Deppe as Althändler (furniture dealer)
Anna Müller-Lincke as Eine Nachbarin Völkers (Völkers' neighbour)
Karl Meixner as Wilde
Karl Hannemann as Lebensmittelhändler (grocer)
Ernst Rotmund as Revierwachtmeister (desk sergeant)
Hans Otto Stern as Kneipenwirt (bartender)

Soundtrack 
 "Unsere Fahne flattert uns voran" (music by Hans-Otto Borgmann, lyrics by Baldur von Schirach)
 Sung several times by the communists: "The Internationale" (written by Eugène Pottier and Pierre Degeyter)
 Sung on the camping trip of the communists and later by a Hitler Youth: "Das ist die Liebe der Matrosen" (written by Werner R. Heymann and Robert Gilbert)

Production and release 
The film was produced in the Universum Film AG (Ufa) studios. The plot was written by Bobby E. Lüthge and Karl Aloys Schenzinger, the author of the novel. Produced by Karl Ritter, it was supported by the Nazi leadership and produced for 320,000 reichsmarks under the aegis of Baldur von Schirach. The latter also wrote the lyrics for the Hitler Youth marching song "Vorwärts! Vorwärts! schmettern die hellen Fanfaren", better known by its refrain, Unsere Fahne flattert uns voran, using an existing melody by Hans-Otto Borgmann, who was also responsible for the music. The director was Hans Steinhoff. For the film, the subtitle Ein Film vom Opfergeist der deutschen Jugend ("A film about the sacrificial spirit of German youth") was added to the novel's title. The film has a length of 95 minutes (2,605 metres) and was premiered on 11 September 1933 at the Ufa-Phoebus Palace in Munich, and on 19 September at the  Ufa-Palast am Zoo in Berlin. It was one of three films about Nazi martyrs in 1933, the other two being SA-Mann Brand and Hans Westmar.

The film's Producer, Karl Ritter, recalled in his private diaries the famous scene where Vater Völker slaps his son violently after he overhears him singing the HJ song Unsere Fahne flattert uns voran.  The diary entry:  Unforgettable was the George–Jürgen Ohlsen ear–slapping scene. George first paid for Jürgen's ice cream and took him into the canteen like a godfather would. Jürgen saw nothing to fear in him. So then, when the dreadful ear–slap scene came, the tears shot from his eyes.  

The film premiered in the United States at the Yorkville Theatre on the Upper East Side of Manhattan on 6 July 1934 as Our Flag Leads Us Forward and in March 1942 in Paris as Le jeune hitlérien.

Reception 
Adolf Hitler, Rudolf Hess, Joseph Goebbels and other high Nazi functionaries attended the first premiere in Munich. Goebbels reflected on the film as follows: "If Hitler Youth Quex represents the first large-scale attempt to depict the ideas and world of National Socialism with the art of cinema, then one must say that this attempt, given the possibilities of modern technology, is a full-fledged success." By January 1934 it had been viewed by a million people.

Hitlerjunge Quex is now classified in Germany as a Vorbehaltsfilm (conditional film), meaning it is illegal to show it outside of closed educational events guided by an expert.

See also 
Der Hitlerjunge Quex, the novel
List of German films 1919-1933
List of German films 1933-1945
Nazism and cinema
Hitler Youth

Sources

Notes

References

External links 
Antti Alanen: Film Diary Hitlerjunge Quex
Axis History Forum Hitlerjunge Quex (Hitler Youth Quex)

Hitlerjunge Quex: Ein Film vom Opfergeist der deutschen Jugend by BDM 

1933 films
1933 drama films
Films of Nazi Germany
1930s German-language films
Films set in Berlin
German black-and-white films
Films based on German novels
German films based on actual events
Hitler Youth
German children's films
Nazi propaganda films
Anti-communist propaganda films
Films directed by Hans Steinhoff
Films set in 1932
Censored films
UFA GmbH films
German drama films
1930s children's films
Films shot at Babelsberg Studios
1930s German films